Bromion is a character in the mythology of William Blake. According to S. Foster Damon (A Blake Dictionary) he represents Reason, from the side of the poet's mind.

Incidence
 Visions of the Daughters of Albion, in which he plays a major role
 Milton
 Jerusalem
 Vala, or The Four Zoas

Relationships
In Vala, or the Four Zoas he is one of a quartet of four sons, with  Rintrah, Palamabron, and Theotormon, whose parents are Los and Enitharmon (or alternatively, sons of Jerusalem).

He is a major character in Visions of the Daughters of Albion. He rapes Oothoon, and then is bound to her, back to back.

References

William Blake's mythology
Male characters in literature